Gongbei Subdistrict  is a township-level division situated in Xiangzhou District, Zhuhai, Guangdong, China.

Education

QSI International School of Zhuhai previously was in Building 2B, HengXin Industry District, Gongbei Subdistrict.

See also
List of township-level divisions of Guangdong

References

Zhuhai
Township-level divisions of Guangdong